Cama is a municipality in the Moesa Region in the Swiss canton of Graubünden.

History
Cama is first mentioned in 1219 as Camma.

Between 1907 and 1978, Mesocco was linked to Bellinzona and the Gotthard railway to the south, and Mesocco to the north, by the Bellinzona–Mesocco railway. The section between Cama and Castione-Arbedo station, on the Gotthard line, remained open for freight until 2003, and is now operated as a tourist railway.

Geography
Of this area, 4.2% is used for agricultural purposes, while 60.1% is forested. Of the rest of the land, 2.7% is settled (buildings or roads) and the remainder (33.1%) is non-productive (rivers, glaciers or mountains).

Before 2017, the municipality was located in the Moesa district in the Roveredo sub-district, along both banks of the Moesa river.  It consists of the village of Cama and the sections of Al Pont and Norantola.

Lago di Cama is located in the municipality.

Demographics
, 13.6% of the population was made up of foreign nationals. Over the last 10 years the population has grown at a rate of 3%.

, the gender distribution of the population was 49.1% male and 50.9% female.  The age distribution, in Cama is; 53 children or 11.2% of the population are between 0 and 9 years old.  16 teenagers or 3.4% are 10 to 14, and 15 teenagers or 3.2% are 15 to 19.  Of the adult population, 67 people or 14.1% of the population are between 20 and 29 years old.  80 people or 16.9% are 30 to 39, 69 people or 14.6% are 40 to 49, and 67 people or 14.1% are 50 to 59.  The senior population distribution is 53 people or 11.2% of the population are between 60 and 69 years old, 38 people or 8.0% are 70 to 79, there are 16 people or 3.4% who are 80 to 89.

In the 2007 federal election the most popular party was the SVP which received 35.3% of the vote.  The next three most popular parties were the CVP (32%), the FDP (17.4%) and the SP (15.3%).

The entire Swiss population is generally well educated.  In Cama about 64.5% of the population (between age 25-64) have completed either non-mandatory upper secondary education or additional higher education (either University or a Fachhochschule).

Cama has an unemployment rate of 2.56%.  , there were 34 people employed in the primary economic sector and about 13 businesses involved in this sector.  46 people are employed in the secondary sector and there are 8 businesses in this sector.  93 people are employed in the tertiary sector, with 18 businesses in this sector.

The historical population is given in the following table:

Languages
Most of the population speaks Italian (88.2%), with German being second most common ( 5.1%) and Portuguese being third ( 2.3%).

References

External links
 
 Val Cama , 

 
Municipalities of Graubünden